The Wonderful Thing is a 1921 American drama film directed by Herbert Brenon and written by Clara Beranger and Herbert Brenon. It is based on the 1920 play The Wonderful Thing by Lillian Trimble Bradley and Forrest Halsey. The film stars Norma Talmadge, Harrison Ford, Julia Hoyt, Howard Truesdale, Robert Agnew and Ethel Fleming. The film was released on November 7, 1921, by Associated First National Pictures.

Cast      
Norma Talmadge as Jacqueline Laurentine Boggs
Harrison Ford as Donald Mannerby
Julia Hoyt as Catherine Mannerby
Howard Truesdale as James Sheridan Boggs
Robert Agnew as Laurence Mannerby
Ethel Fleming as Dulcie Mannerby Fosdick
Mabel Bert as Lady Sophia Alexandria Mannerby
Fanny Burke as Angelica Mannerby
Walter McEwen as 'Smooth Bill' Carser
Charles Craig as General Lancaster

See also
The Wonderful Thing About Tiggers

References

External links
 

1921 films
1920s English-language films
Silent American drama films
1921 drama films
First National Pictures films
Films directed by Herbert Brenon
American silent feature films
American black-and-white films
1920s American films